Ingrid Camilla Fosse Sæthre (born 19 January 1978) is a Norwegian footballer who played as a forward for the Norway women's national football team. She was part of the team at the 2003 FIFA Women's World Cup. On club level she played for Arna-Bjørnar, retiring in 2006. She made a comeback for Stabæk in 2010. Sæthre made 15 caps for the club from 2010–2011 and scored three goals.

Honors and awards
 with Stabæk
 Toppserien winner: 2010

References

External links
 

1978 births
Living people
Norwegian women's footballers
Norway women's international footballers
Place of birth missing (living people)
2003 FIFA Women's World Cup players
Women's association football forwards
Arna-Bjørnar players
Stabæk Fotball Kvinner players